Selayang Municipal Council (Jawi: مجليس ڤربندرن سلايڠ) is a local authority which administrates Gombak district and surrounding areas. This agency is under Selangor state government. MPS is responsible for public health and sanitation, waste removal and management, town planning, environmental protection and building control, social and economic development and general maintenance functions of urban infrastructure. The MPS main headquarters is located at Bandar Baru Selayang.

History 
Formerly known as Gombak District Council (Majlis Daerah Gombak) from 1 January 1977, this agency was granted municipal status on 1 January 1997.

Presidents

Organisation chart

President (Yang di-Pertua) of Selayang
Mohd Yazid Sairi

Chief Information Officer
Zulaina Abu Talib

Councilors

2021/2022 Session

Departments 
 Jabatan Khidmat Pengurusan (Management Services Department)
 Jabatan Perbendaharaan (Treasury Department)
 Jabatan Penilaian dan Pengurusan Harta
 Jabatan Perhubungan Awam dan Perancangan Korporat (Corporate Planning and Public Communications Department)
 Jabatan Perancang Bandar dan Pembangunan (Town Planning and Development Department)
 Jabatan Perkhidmatan Perbandaran dan Kesihatan (Municipal and Health Services Department)
 Jabatan Penguatkuasaan dan Keselamatan (Enforcement and Safety Department)
 Jabatan Kejuruteraan (Engineering Department)
 Bahagian Perundangan
 Bahagian Audit Dalam
 Bahagian Perolehan
 Bahagian Hasil
 Unit Pusat Setempat

Branch office
Rawang
Batu Arang

Sports

Sport Avenue
Majlis Perbandaran Selayang Stadium

Floral Emblem      
Siantan (Ixora Sunkist)

Administration Area
Below are the administration area for MPS which further breakdown into 24 zones.

References

External links 
MPS official web site 

Local government in Selangor
Municipal councils in Malaysia